Chantal Langlacé (born 6 January 1955) is a French long-distance runner who is recognized by the International Association of Athletics Federations as having set a world best in the marathon on two occasions. Langlacé set a world best mark on 27 October 1974 with a 2:46:24 performance in Neuf-Brisach, France, then recaptured it from American Jacqueline Hansen on 1 May 1977 with 2:35:16 in Oiartzun, Spain.

Langlacé earned a national title in the 25 kilometers and set five national records in the marathon, as well as one each in the half marathon, the 25 kilometers, the 100 kilometers, and the one hour run. She competed in the women's marathon at the 1983 World Championships, but failed to finish. Langlacé is a three-time champion of the Neuf Brisach Marathon. In addition to her record setting performance there in 1974, she also won in 1973 and 1976. Langlacé won the Paris Marathon in 1981 as well as the Lille Métropole Marathon, now run as the Lille Métropole Half Marathon, in 1986 and 1987.

Achievements

References

1955 births
World record setters in athletics (track and field)
French female marathon runners
Living people
French female long-distance runners
Paris Marathon female winners
World Athletics Championships athletes for France
20th-century French women